Dead at 21 is an American drama series broadcast by MTV in 1994. The series ran for eleven thirty-minute episodes with a two-part final episode. The series was created by Jon Sherman, and written by Sherman, P.K. Simonds and Manny Coto.

Premise
Ed Bellamy (Jack Noseworthy) discovers on his 20th birthday that he was an unknowing subject of a childhood medical experiment. Microchips had been implanted in his brain, which make him a genius but will also kill him by his 21st birthday.

Accompanied by Maria Cavalos (Lisa Dean Ryan), Ed tries to find a way to prevent his death. The research center orders the termination of the project and the elimination of anyone involved. The center frames Ed for a murder and sends Agent Winston (Whip Hubley) to capture him.

Episodes

Reception
Ken Tucker of Entertainment Weekly rated the series as "B+." He described the dialog as "lame" but praised Noseworthy as a "lissome hunk," adding that the subtext "plays brilliantly" to the adolescent self-absorption of the MTV audience.

References

External links 
 

1994 American television series debuts
1994 American television series endings
1990s American science fiction television series
English-language television shows
MTV original programming